Michael Walsh (born 1986) is an Irish hurler who currently plays as a left wing-back for the London senior hurling team.

Career

Inter-county
Walsh began his inter-county career as a member of the Cork senior hurling team. After emigrating from Ireland he subsequently linked up with the London senior hurling team. As an inter-county hurler he has won one Christy Ring Cup winners' medal and one Nicky Rackard Cup winners' medal.

Club
At club level Walsh is a one-time county club championship medalist with the Robert Emmett's club. He currently plays with Kildorrery in Cork.

References

1986 births
Living people
Cork inter-county hurlers
London inter-county hurlers
Kildorrery hurlers
Robert Emmett's (London) hurlers
Irish schoolteachers